Luciano Federico L is a high-speed B60 catamaran ferry, which operates between Buenos Aires and Montevideo, a distance of .

The ship is based on the Type 1130 catamaran, designed by AMD Marine Consulting of Sydney, Australia, and has an overall hull length of 77.32m, a beam of 19.5m and a full load draught of 2.15m. The boat was built in 1997 by the Spanish shipbuilder, Navantia. The ship can carry up to 450 passengers and 52 cars.

The Luciano Federico L holds the Guinness World Record for the fastest car ferry boat in the world with a recorded top speed of  during sea trials.

References

1997 ships
Ships of Uruguay
Individual catamarans
Ferries